The Étang de Thau or Bassin de Thau is the largest of a string of lagoons (étangs) that stretch along the French coast from the Rhône river to the foothills of the Pyrenees and the border to Spain in the Languedoc-Roussillon.  Although it has a high salinity, it is considered the second largest lake in France.

Description

The mean depth of the lagoon is 4.5 m, but in the central navigation channel it can be 10 m deep. Near Bouzigues there is a 100-metre diameter depression of 30 metres. This 'Fosse de la Vise' is the source of a hot spring that feeds the spa in Balaruc.

Its size and depth, which distinguish it from other lagoons of the region, is explained by the geomorphology of the region: it is the syncline formed from folding which produced the corresponding anticline of the Gardiole in the north east.

Until relatively recently the lagoons from Marseillan to the Rhône were a continuous stretch of inland waterway. Early settlers described this as "une petite mer intérieure et tranquille" ("a small sea, inner and quiet"). It provided access to, in particular, Marseillan—a fishing village that became a trade centre.

Linked, now, by the Canal du Rhône à Sète to the river Rhône and by the Canal du Midi to Bordeaux via Toulouse, the lagoon also has access to the Mediterranean at Sète. There is also a small canal (le canal des Allemands or the pisse-saume) that links the western end to the sea at Marseillan Plage. This canal is only suitable for small craft since both road and railway bridges restrict height.

To the east, between Balaruc and Sète, the borders of the lagoon are largely industrial. The south bank is formed by the coastal strip from Sète to Cap d'Agde. The northern side has villages dedicated to fishing and the production of shellfish. There are harbours in the towns of Marseillan, Mèze and Bouzigues, with smaller ports dedicated to shellfish on the northern shore.

There is significant variation in the rainfall in the catchment basin for the lagoon, both seasonally and between years. The annual precipitation can range from 200 to 1,000 mm per year. As a result, the water temperature and salinity have extensive ranges. Water temperature ranges from 3 °C to 29 °C, with salinities of 27 psu to 40 psu. The salinity changes during the year with lows from February to June and peaks in July to January.

Administration
Located between the towns of Sète and Marseillan in the Hérault département, the Étang de Thau is shared administratively by the communes of (running clockwise): Balaruc-le-Vieux, Balaruc-les-Bains, Frontignan, Sète, Marseillan, Mèze, Loupian and Bouzigues.

Economy and natural resources
As the lagoon is open to the sea, it has fish such as the gilt-head bream (dorade), the meagre (maigre, a kind of croaker) and the sea bass. The lagoon produces approximately 200 kg/ha/year of fish. However, the shellfish industry is more economically important. Eighteen varieties of shellfish are taken from the lagoon - the most important being oysters. 750 producers farm 2,750 oyster tables and take some 13,000 tonnes annually. This provides for about 8.5% of France's consumption. Oysters from the Étang de Thau are marketed under the name huîtres de Bouzigues (Bouzigues oysters) after the village of Bouzigues where oyster production started. They are a cupped variety. Fixed with cement to ropes, the young oysters are immersed in the water until they reach a size suitable for consumption. Thau water is graded A and so shellfish can be caught and consumed within minutes. In addition to oysters, some 3,000 tonnes of mussels are produced every year.

Apart from fishing and shellfish, the Étang de Thau provides income through tourism, particularly via sailing schools.

Wildlife

The Bassin de Thau provides a habitat for a variety of wild animals, notably birds such as herons and pink flamingos and a rich marine fauna, including bivalves (oysters and mussels), jellyfish, fish, and algae. Periodically in the spring and summer, the Thau Lagoon has algae blooms of Alexandrium catenella which sometimes reach such high levels that it results in contamination of the lagoon's bivalves with algae toxins.

Gallery

Notes

External links

Website of panoramic photos of the Thau lagoon and its region
Photos of the Etang de Thau
Thau fisheries 
Info on Thau and oysters 

Thau
Thau, Etang de Thau
Lagoons of Europe
Bodies of water of France
Gulf of Lion